Men's basketball at the 2002 Asian Games was held in Geumjeong Gymnasium and Sajik Arena, Busan from September 28 to October 14, 2002.

Squads

Results
All times are Korea Standard Time (UTC+09:00)

Preliminary round

Group A

Group B

Group C

Group D

9~12 placing

Quarterfinals

Group I

Group II

5~8 placing

7/8 placing

5/6 placing

Final round

Semifinals

3/4 placing

Final

Final standing

References

Results

External links
Official website

Men